Oran Township may refer to the following townships in the United States:

 Oran Township, Logan County, Illinois
 Oran Township, Fayette County, Iowa